Rolf Göran Claeson (born 4 March 1945) is a former speed skater from Sweden.

Claeson participated in the 1,500 m at the 1968 Winter Olympics of Grenoble, but finished only 20th. In 1969, at the first European Allround Championships in which Claeson participated, he won bronze. Three weeks later, at the first World Allround Championships in which he participated, he won silver. More international medals followed during the next few years, but none of them were gold. Then, after the 1971–1972 season, two of the world's top skaters, Ard Schenk and Kees Verkerk, joined a newly formed professional league. Another top skater, Dag Fornæss, retired from speed skating. The following season, Claeson promptly became both European and World Allround Champion.

Claeson won several more medals, including a bronze medal on the 1,500 m at the 1972 Winter Olympics of Sapporo. In 1975, he entered the European Allround Championships as the reigning European Champion, but he finished only 11th. He retired from speed skating that same year.

Medals

An overview of medals won by Claeson at important championships he participated in, listing the years in which he won each:

In addition, Claeson won a total of 25 Swedish National Championships titles:
 Swedish Championships 1,500 m: 1969, 1970, 1971, 1973, 1974, and 1975.
 Swedish Championships 5,000 m: 1969, 1970, 1971, 1972, 1973, 1974, and 1975.
 Swedish Championships 10,000 m: 1970, 1971, 1972, 1973, and 1974.
 Swedish Championships Allround: 1969, 1970, 1971, 1972, 1973, 1974, and 1975.

Records

World record 
Over the course of his career, Claeson skated one world record:

Source: SpeedSkatingStats.com

Personal records
To put these personal records in perspective, the column WR lists the official world records on the dates that Claeson skated his personal records.

Claeson has an Adelskalender score of 168.868 points. His highest ranking on the Adelskalender was a second place.

References 

 Göran Claeson at SpeedSkatingStats.com
 Göran Claeson from Deutsche Eisschnelllauf Gemeinschaft e.V. (the German Skating Association)
 Personal records from Jakub Majerski's Speedskating Database
 Evert Stenlund's Adelskalender pages
 Historical World Records from the International Skating Union
 National Champions  from Svenska Skridskoförbundet (the Swedish Skating Association)

1945 births
Living people
Swedish male speed skaters
World record setters in speed skating
Olympic speed skaters of Sweden
Olympic bronze medalists for Sweden
Speed skaters at the 1968 Winter Olympics
Speed skaters at the 1972 Winter Olympics
Olympic medalists in speed skating
Medalists at the 1972 Winter Olympics
World Allround Speed Skating Championships medalists
20th-century Swedish people